The Stone First Nation or Yunesitʼin First Nation is a band government of the Yunesit'in subgroup of the Tsilhqot'in people, whose territory is the Chilcotin District in the western Central Interior region of the Canadian province of British Columbia.  It is a member of the Tsilhqot'in Tribal Council.   The people of the Stone First Nation are known as the Yunesit'in in the Chilcotin language.

The Stone First Nation's offices are located at the town of Hanceville, about 90 km west of Williams Lake.

Indian reserves

Indian Reserves under the administration of the Stone First Nation are:
Brigham Creek Indian Reserve No. 3, 14 miles SW of Hanceville, 72.80 ha. 
Saddle Horse Indian Reserve No. 2, 8 miles S of Hanceville, 129.50 ha. 
Stone Indian Reserve No. 1, right (south) bank of the Chilcotin River, 4 miles west of Hanceville, 1588.40 ha.  With IR No. 1A, known as the Stone Reserve, or simply "Stone" 
Stone Indian Reserve No. 1A, south of and adjoining IR. No. 1, 161.50 ha. 
Stone Indian Reserve No. 4, on Minto Creek, 8 miles SW of Hanceville, 194.20 ha.

Chief and councillors

Treaty process
Stone First Nation is not participating in the BC Treaty Process.

Demographics
The Stone First Nation has 400 members, with 211 living on reserve.

Social, educational and cultural programs and facilities
There is a youth centre and maintained hockey rink; the school does not have a gym but there is a ball-hockey court outside.

See also
Carrier-Chilcotin Tribal Council

References

External links
 Tsilhqot'in Tribal Council website

Tsilhqot'in governments